The ATB Okotoks Classic is an annual bonspiel, or curling tournament, held at the Okotoks Curling Club in Okotoks, Alberta. It has been held since 2020. The event is sponsored by ATB Financial, a financial institution in Alberta.

The 2022 event was the first leg in the "Players Tour presented by Curling Live".

Past champions

References

2020 establishments in Alberta
Okotoks
Curling competitions in Alberta